Meghnagar railway station is a small railway station in Jhabua district, Madhya Pradesh. Its code is MGN. It serves Meghnagar city. The station consists of three platforms. The platforms are not well sheltered. It lacks many facilities including water and sanitation.

The railway station of Meghnagar is located on New Delhi–Mumbai main line. Meghnagar is well connected to Bhopal, Ujjain, Gwalior, Jaipur, Jabalpur, Katni, Ratlam and Bina within the state and almost every other state of India. The station is a border station between Gujarat & Madhya Pradesh and railhead for Jhabua town. Meghnagar is situated 81 km from Ratlam and 33 km from Dahod on Mathura–Vadodara section of Western Railway.

Major trains

The following trains halt at Meghnagar railway station in both directions :

 Avantika Express
 Paschim Express
 Sabarmati Express
 Gandhidham–Shri Mata Vaishno Devi Katra Sarvodaya Express
 Shanti Express
 Swaraj Express
 Golden Temple Mail
 Firozpur Janata Express
 Bandra Terminus–Gorakhpur Avadh Express
 Bandra Terminus–Muzaffarpur Avadh Express
 Jaipur–Bandra Terminus Superfast Express
 Jaipur Superfast Express
 Indore–Pune Superfast Express
 Somnath–Jabalpur Express (via Itarsi)
 Somnath–Jabalpur Express (via Bina)
 Jamnagar–Shri Mata Vaishno Devi Katra Express	
 Habibganj–Dahod Fast Passenger
 Bandra Terminus–Dehradun Express

References

External links
 Wikimapia

Railway stations in Jhabua district
Ratlam railway division
Jhabua